Vissarion οr Visarion is a Greek male name, which may refer to:

Given name
 Saint Bessarion of Egypt, also Bessarion the Great or Passarion, Egyptian anchorite, thaumaturge and abbot, pupil of Saint Anthony the Great
 Basilios Bessarion (1403–1472), Greek scholar, Catholic cardinal and Latin patriarch of Constantinople
 Visarion, Metropolitan of Herzegovina (s. 1590–1602)
 Vissarion Belinsky (1811–1848), Russian literary critic
 Visarion Ljubiša (1823–1884), Metropolitan of Montenegro (s. 1882–84)
 Vissarion Dzhugashvili (1849–1909), father of Joseph Vissarionovich Stalin
 Visarion Puiu (1879–1964), born as Victor Puiu, Romanian metropolitan bishop
 Visarion Xhuvani (1890–1965), Primate of the Orthodox Church of Albania (s. 1929–37)
 Vissarion Lominadze (1897–1935), Georgian revolutionary and Soviet politician
 Vissarion Shebalin (1902–1963), Soviet Russian composer
 Vissarion Korkoliacos (1908–1991), Greek Orthodox monk
 Vissarion (born 1961 as Sergey Anatolyevitch Torop), Russian mystic

Surname
 I. C. Vissarion (1879–1951), Romanian writer

Greek masculine given names